Maurice de Wée (25 February 1891 – 1961) was a Belgian fencer. He competed in the individual épée event at the 1920 Summer Olympics.

References

1891 births
1961 deaths
Belgian male fencers
Belgian épée fencers
Olympic fencers of Belgium
Fencers at the 1920 Summer Olympics